The 2016–17 GRUNDIGligaen is the 52nd season of the GRUNDIGligaen, Norwegian's top-tier handball league. A total of twelve teams contest this season's league. Elverum Håndball are the defending champions.

Format
The competition format for the 2016–17 season consists of a home-and-away double round-robin system. The first eight teams qualifies for play-offs, while the last two plays relegation round. The last team of this relegation round is relegated.

Teams

The following 12 clubs compete in the GRUNDIGligaen during the 2016–17 season.

Regular season

Standings

Results

Play-offs

Relegation round

''Falk Horten won 55-51 aggregate, and stay in Grundigligaen.

References

External links
 GRUNDIGligaen

Norway
Handball
Handball
Handball competitions in Norway